Love in the Cowshed (German: Liebe im Kuhstall) is a 1928 German silent drama film directed by Carl Froelich and starring Henny Porten, Toni Tetzlaff and Eugen Neufeld.
The film's art direction was by Gustav A. Knauer and Willy Schiller. It was distributed by the German branch of Universal Pictures.

Cast
Henny Porten as Marischka  
Toni Tetzlaff as Countess Koritowska, her mother  
Eugen Neufeld as Albrecht, Knight of Holodronz 
Ivan Koval-Samborsky as Janos, nephew 
Wolf von Beneckendorff as Herzog Leopold Maria 
Hadrian Maria Netto as Von Palleske, Rittmeister a.D.  
Oskar Karlweis as Wedelski, first lieutenant a.D. 
Otto Wallburg as Wenzel, soap cutter 
Felix Bressart as bailiff 
Helga Klein as waitress  
Anton Pointner

References

External links

Films of the Weimar Republic
Films directed by Carl Froelich
German silent feature films
German comedy-drama films
1928 comedy-drama films
Universal Pictures films
German black-and-white films
Silent comedy-drama films
1920s German films